This is about the planned bill introduced in 2004. For other proposed bills of the same name, see Succession to the Crown Bill

The Succession to the Crown Bill was a British Private Member's Bill aimed at reforming the manner of succession to the British monarchy published in the House of Lords by Labour peer Lord Dubs on 9 December 2004, and withdrawn by him on 14 January 2005, after the Government said that it would block the Bill.

It would have involved three major measures: firstly, the change of the form of primogeniture used from male-preference to gender-neutral (absolute) primogeniture—that is, that the eldest child would succeed regardless of gender; secondly, that the Acts of Union 1707, both in Scotland and in England, as well as other relevant legislation, be altered to remove the clauses forbidding the monarch or heirs from marrying any Catholic; and, thirdly, the revocation of the Royal Marriages Act 1772, which requires descendants of King George II (other than descendants of princesses who married foreigners) to obtain the Sovereign's consent to marry. However, the provisions of the Act of Settlement 1701, barring the monarch from being Catholic, would have still remained in force.

The most immediate effect of the Bill passing and becoming law would have been the moving of Princess Anne from her then position of ninth on the line of succession to the British throne to fourth, displacing Prince Andrew, Duke of York. It was unclear as to how the Bill would have affected the line of succession in the other 15 Commonwealth realms as it explicitly applied to the United Kingdom only. The Bill drew on the recommendations of the Fabian Society's Commission on the Future of the Monarchy, which reported in 2003. Lord Dubs is a member of the Fabian Society's executive committee.

External links 
 The actual text of the Bill
 An article in The Guardian on the Bill
 An editorial in  The Times supporting the Bill's proposals
 Information on the Bill from the Fabian Society
 BBC News article on the Bill being withdrawn

2004 in British politics
Succession to the British crown
Proposed laws of the United Kingdom
2004 in British law